is a Japanese singer and live streamer. He is a member of the J-pop group Strawberry Prince.

Biography 

Jel was recruited by Nanamori to join Strawberry Prince in mid-2016. On February 24, 2021, he released his first solo album, Believe. It placed third on the Oricon weekly album ranking and second on the Oricon daily album ranking.

In August 2022, Jel announced that he would be going on hiatus following a concert later that month due to depression.

Discography

Albums

Singles

Filmography

Anime

References

External links 

 Official YouTube channel

Living people
Japanese male pop singers
1996 births
Utaite
Japanese YouTubers

People from Osaka